Thomas Wilson (September 11, 1765January 24, 1826) was a U.S. Representative from Virginia, father of Edgar Campbell Wilson and grandfather of Eugene McLanahan Wilson.

Early life
Wilson was born in Staunton in the Colony of Virginia, and studied law there.

Career
He was admitted to the bar on September 21, 1789, and commenced practice in Morgantown, Virginia (now West Virginia). He served as member of the Virginia Senate from 1792 to 1795 and in the Virginia House of Delegates in 1799 and 1800. He was again a member of the Virginia Senate 1800–1804.

Wilson was elected as a Federalist to the Twelfth Congress (March 4, 1811 – March 3, 1813) defeating Democratic-Republican William McKinley. He was again a member of the Virginia House of Delegates in 1816 and 1817, after which he resumed the practice of law.

Death
He died in Morgantown, Virginia (now West Virginia) on January 24, 1826, and was interred in Oak Grove Cemetery in Morgantown.

Sources

1765 births
1826 deaths
Politicians from Morgantown, West Virginia
Virginia lawyers
Virginia state senators
Members of the Virginia House of Delegates
Federalist Party members of the United States House of Representatives from Virginia
19th-century American lawyers
Lawyers from Morgantown, West Virginia
Burials at Oak Grove Cemetery (Morgantown, West Virginia)